La Méridionale is a French shipping company. The company's three vessels serve the Corsican ports of Bastia, Ajaccio and Propriano, and Porto Torres in Sardinia. The fleet is exclusively composed of mixed vessels (freight and passengers). It is part of the STEF group and, together with the former SNCM, provides passage to Corsica.

History 
La Méridionale is the result of the "Compagnie méridionale de navigation", the oldest shipping company serving Corsica; it celebrated its 80th anniversary in 2011.

1931 - 2011 
"La Compagnie méridionale de navigation" was born from the marriage of Mr. Giannoni's daughters and the Rastit brothers in 1931. This association created the company's links with Corsica.

At first, the company transported petroleum products and general cargo. In 1970 it adopted the Roll-on/roll-off style and strengthened the Corsica-Continent links.

At the beginning of 1990, La Méridionale was the leading French shipping company in the Mediterranean and France's second largest operator of passenger ships at the national level.

In 1992, the company joined the STEF-TFE group and the following year outfitted the Kalliste. It obtained both ISM and ISO 9002 certifications.
In November 2001, it renewed its public service concession with SNCM between Marseille and Corsica.

2011- 
In 2011, following the arrival of the ship Piana, existing ships Girolata, Kalliste and Scandola were repainted and "La Compagnie méridionale de navigation" (known as CMN) changed its logo to La Méridionale.

At the end of 2016, the Girolata was repainted and work was carried out to install a ballast water treatment system. The same modifications were made to the Kalliste in 2017.

On 1 January 2017, La Méridionale began weekly service between Propriano (Corsica) and Porto Torres (Sardinia).

Lines and current fleet 
La Méridionale's vessels make round trips between Marseille and Bastia (Piana), Ajaccio (Girolata), Propriano (Kalliste) and Sardinia (Kalliste). Sea crossings are made at night, with one departure every evening. La Méridionale has three mixed vessels (passengers and freight) operated under the French flag:

Corsica - Continent:

Other companies 
 Corsica Ferries
 Corsica Linéa
 Moby Lines

References

External links 
 Site officiel

Meridionale, La
Meridionale, La
Meridionale, La
Transport in Corsica
Companies based in Marseille